Big Otter Lake is located west of Thendara, New York. Fish species present in the lake are brook trout, white sucker, sunfish, yellow perch, and black bullhead. Trail access off NY-28 via Big Otter Lake Trail. No motors are allowed on Big Otter Lake.

References 

Lakes of Herkimer County, New York